Pongo River can refer to:

 The Pongo River (Guinea), an estuary in Guinea
 The Pongo River (South Sudan), a river in the Bahr el Ghazal region of South Sudan.

See also
 Pungo River, a river in North Carolina
 Pongo (disambiguation)